Scotty Cameron is an American sports equipment brand established by Don T. "Scotty" Cameron (born 8 November 1962), a golf club manufacturer primarily known for making putters. Scotty Cameron is part of the Acushnet Company brand portfolio since 2011, when the corporation acquired it from Fortune Brands.

Personal life 
Cameron was born in Glendale, California. He later moved to Fountain Valley, where he grew up, attending high school in nearby Huntington Beach Edison High School. He now lives in Carlsbad, California with his wife and two daughters.

Career and company 

Cameron learned how to make putters with his father in the family's garage at an early age.

During the mid-90s, a number of CNC milling facilities around the country, including X-Cel Technologies in Chicago, provided milling services for Scotty Cameron.

In 1991, Cameron designed and manufactured putters and worked directly with select golf equipment manufacturers, including Maxfli, Cleveland and the Ray Cook Golf Company. During this year, he manufactured his first retail production putter, nicknamed the Fry's Pity Putter. Later that year, Cameron began producing putters exclusively for Mizuno.

In late 1992, Cameron and his wife, Kathy, set up Cameron Golf International and began selling the Scotty Cameron Classic line of putters. In 1993, Bernhard Langer won the Masters Tournament using a Cameron prototype putter. The win helped to jumpstart the Camerons' new company.

In August 1994, Titleist fought off competition from five other companies to contract with Cameron to make putters exclusively for the Acushnet Company. Since then, the Scotty Cameron brand has grown to be one of the leading names in golf.

In 1996, the first Scotty Cameron Putter Studio was established in San Diego's North County, where the top players in the world came to analyze and understand their putting strokes and have custom putters created by Cameron.

In 2004, the Acushnet Company expanded the Putter Studio's square footage and capabilities. Cameron and his team moved to a new research and development facility built from the ground up. The Putter Studio also houses the Custom Shop, where anyone can prepare an order online and send a Scotty Cameron putter for restoration and/or customization.

In 2007, the Scotty Cameron Museum & Gallery was opened in Japan, near Tokyo. It houses many one-of-a-kind Scotty Cameron products, putters and prototypes, including many personal artifacts.

On May 20, 2011, Fortune Brands, Inc. announced an agreement for the sale of its Acushnet Company golf business, including the Scotty Cameron brand, to a group led by Fila Korea Ltd., for $1.225 billion in cash. According to Gene Yoon, chairman of Fila Korea, the acquisition provides them with well-known brands to sell in emerging markets in Asia.

Golf galleries 
The Scotty Cameron Golf Gallery, a place for golfers to experience the Art of Putting, the same methodology and technology used by Scotty Cameron in fitting the best players in the world, opened its doors on July 9, 2014, just north of San Diego.

The gallery, located off Highway 101 in the quaint Southern California beach town of Encinitas, is described as "part retail space, part high-end product gallery, 100-percent putter fitting facility." It is an extension of the Scotty Cameron Putter Studio, which Tour players from around the world visit regularly. At the gallery, golfers gain the knowledge provided by Cameron's proprietary high-speed video putting stroke analysis tools, as well as the expertise of his highly trained fitters.

The gallery also features a rotating array of rare Scotty Cameron Tour putters and one-off creations. Luxury apparel personally selected by Cameron is also available.

In May 2016, Cameron opened the doors to the Scotty Cameron Golf Gallery Tokyo in the chic shopping district of Aoyama. Located on the third floor of the Jewels of Aoyama building, visitors are presented with an elegant boutique experience that mirrors the essence of Cameron's brand.

Similar to the California Gallery, the Tokyo Gallery houses limited and unique Cameron creations, apparel and never-seen-before Tour putters crafted for discerning players and connoisseurs. A fitting studio opened in the summer of 2016 presents players with the same Tour-quality putter fitting experience offered in the California Putter Studio and Gallery.

Tiger Woods
Tiger Woods used one specific Scotty Cameron putter for the majority of his career and during 14 of his 15 major championships (he used a different Scotty Cameron putter in his 1997 Masters victory). It is made of 303 German Stainless Steel. It has a single sight dot and a red "cherry dot" on both the face and in the back cavity. The putter has a blank sole and has "Tiger" on the left bumper and "Woods" on the right bumper. Woods uses a Ping grip on his putter. He had used a Scotty Cameron putter for all of his professional golf victories up to December 2011. His most used Scotty Cameron putter was first put into play May 1999 at the GTE Byron Nelson Classic-Where he shot 61 in his first round with the putter. This historic putter possibly was originally milled By Bob Bettinardi, as were most Scotty Cameron putters from 1992 to 1998/9

In 2010, Woods switched from the putter he had been using since 1999 to a Nike Method 001 putter. This change was not without controversy, and Woods spent almost a year experimenting with different Nike models before settling on a configuration he liked.

In 2016, at the Hero World Challenge, Woods went back to his Scotty Cameron putter after not playing a tournament in 16 months. He said the putter went back into his bag the day after Nike announced their exit from the golf equipment business. It is the same putter that he used to win 14 of his 15 majors.

In 2019 Tiger Woods used this putter to capture his 15th Major.

Major victories 
A number of other professional golfers use Scotty Camerons, including some who are on staff of many other major golf companies (Nike, Taylormade, Callaway, etc.). Since 1993, more than 500 worldwide tournaments and about 1/3 (Tiger Woods has won almost 1/2 of these with his Scotty Cameron putter) of the four majors have been won by a player using a Scotty Cameron putter. In 1996, The Scotty Cameron brand won its first putter count on Tour via the Darrell Survey. Scotty Cameron putters rank second in wins in the modern era, behind Ping.

1993 Masters Tournament - Bernhard Langer
1997 Masters Tournament - Tiger Woods
1997 Open Championship - Justin Leonard
1998 PGA Championship - Vijay Singh
1999 PGA Championship - Tiger Woods
2000 U.S. Open - Tiger Woods
2000 Open Championship - Tiger Woods
2000 PGA Championship - Tiger Woods
2001 Masters Tournament - Tiger Woods
2001 Open Championship - David Duval
2001 PGA Championship - David Toms
2002 Masters Tournament - Tiger Woods
2002 U.S. Open - Tiger Woods
2003 Masters Tournament - Mike Weir
2003 Open Championship - Ben Curtis
2004 Masters Tournament - Phil Mickelson
2005 Masters Tournament - Tiger Woods
2005 Open Championship - Tiger Woods
2006 U.S. Open - Geoff Ogilvy
2006 Open Championship - Tiger Woods
2006 PGA Championship - Tiger Woods
2007 PGA Championship - Tiger Woods
2008 Masters Tournament - Trevor Immelman
2008 U.S. Open - Tiger Woods
2011 U.S. Open - Rory McIlroy
2011 Open Championship - Darren Clarke
2012 PGA Championship - Rory McIlroy
2013 Masters Tournament - Adam Scott
2013 PGA Championship - Jason Dufner
 2015 Masters Tournament - Jordan Spieth
 2015 U.S. Open - Jordan Spieth
 2016 U.S. Open - Dustin Johnson
 2016 PGA Championship - Jimmy Walker
 2017 U.S. Open - Brooks Koepka
 2017 Open Championship - Jordan Spieth
 2017 PGA Championship - Justin Thomas
 2018 U.S. Open (golf)  - Brooks Koepka
 2018 PGA Championship - Brooks Koepka
2019 Masters Tournament - Tiger Woods
 2019 PGA Championship - Brooks Koepka
2019 U.S. Open - Gary Woodland
2022 Masters Tournament - Scottie Scheffler
2022 PGA Championship - Justin Thomas
 2022 Open Championship - Cameron Smith

References

External links
 

Fortune Brands brands
Golf equipment manufacturers
American companies established in 1991
1991 introductions